Harlan P. Sanborn (1889-1948) was best known for being the head coach of the Virginia Tech Hokies men's basketball team and the North Carolina Tar Heels men's basketball team.

Coaching at Virginia Tech
Sanborn was the head coach of Virginia Tech men's basketball during the 1916–17 basketball season.  As head coach of the Hokies, Sanborn led the team to a record of 17–2.  Sanborn's .895 winning percentage is the second highest of any Virginia Tech men's basketball head coach.  Sanborn left as head coach after coaching only one season for Virginia Tech, one in which the final Premo-Porretta Power Poll listed the Hokies at #21.

Coaching at North Carolina
After Monk McDonald left as the North Carolina head coach, Sanborn became the head coach of the North Carolina Tar Heels.  Sanborn would inherit a strong North Carolina team, with Jack Cobb, who would later be named to the All-American team and would later have his number retired at North Carolina, Bill Dodderer, and Sam McDonald.  These players had earned the nickname for the Tar Heels as the "White Phantoms" because of their fast playmaking and defense. Sanborn's team was very successful going undefeated at home playing in the Tin Can.

In one of the more memorable games during Sanborn's time as head coach, the Tar Heels played NC State Wolfpack team that planned to slow down the game in order to counter the Tar Heels fast offense.  Because there was no shot clock in college basketball at this time, the team on offense could hold the ball as long as they wanted without taking a shot.  In the end, the Wolfpack was able to maintain control of the ball and North Carolina lost the game with a final score of 17–8.  These eight points are the fewest points ever scored in a North Carolina game.

By the end of the season, North Carolina had won the regular season when going into the Southern Conference Tournament.  In the Southern Conference Tournament, North Carolina made it to the finals and beat Mississippi State in the finals to win the tournament.  This would be the third year in a row that the Tar Heels won the Southern Conference regular season and the Southern Conference Tournament all while having three different head coaches.  The final Premo-Porretta Power Poll has North Carolina ranked #18.

After the season ended, Sanborn left as head coach of the Tar Heels and James N. Ashmore took over as head coach.  This would be the fourth coaching change in four years.

Head coaching record

References
General

 
 
 
 

Specific

American men's basketball coaches
North Carolina Tar Heels men's basketball coaches
Virginia Tech Hokies men's basketball coaches
Dartmouth College alumni
1889 births
1948 deaths